Len Wickwar (11 March 1911 – 1 June 1980) was a British boxer who fought between 1928 and 1947, mostly as a lightweight. He fought more verified professional fights than any other boxer in history at 473 with 4,020 rounds fought in his 19 year career.

Career 
Born in Leicester, Wickwar turned professional in 1928 at the age of 17 and made his debut on 23 October at flyweight, knocking out Jim Young Shepherdson in the fourth round at Leicester's Spinney Hill Club. He had been discovered by manager George Biddles at a gym above the Friar Tuck public house on Woodgate. Biddles also managed the Nottinghamshire featherweight Tish Marsden. Starting his career fighting in small clubs, Wickwar would fight up to three times in one night. In 1934 alone he had 58 fights.

In December 1937, Wickwar beat then British lightweight champion Jimmy Walsh in a non-title fight at Granby Halls. By 1938, Wickwar was an "official contender" for the British lightweight title then held by Dave Crowley. Although he never got a shot at the title, one of his biggest fights was at Welford Road Stadium in July 1939 in front of a crowd of 14,000, in a non-title fight against reigning British champion Eric Boon, who had taken the lightweight title from Crowley eight months earlier; Wickwar was knocked out by Boon in the ninth round.

His boxing career was put on hold during World War II; He returned to boxing after the war but only fought four more times before retiring. In his final fight he was knocked out in the fifth round by Danny Cunningham in a welterweight contest on 6 February 1947.

He fought a total of 470 professional fights, which is the highest amount by any boxer, including 340 victories.

After retiring from boxing, Wickwar lived in the New Parks area of Leicester and worked for local company Bentley Engineering as a packer and labourer.

Coincidentally, both Marsden and Wickwar died on exactly the same day in 1980.

Professional boxing record

References

External links

|-

|-

1911 births
1980 deaths
Boxers from Leicester
English male boxers
Lightweight boxers